New Jersey increased from 3 seats to 4 seats after the 1790 census.

Following the 1790 census, New Jersey's apportionment increased from 4 to 5 seats.

See also 
 United States House of Representatives elections, 1792 and 1793
 List of United States representatives from New Jersey

References 

New Jersey
1792
United States House of Representatives